Young And Getting It, stylized as Y.A.G.I, is the debut studio album of Nigerian rapper Lil Kesh. Released through YBNL Nation on March 17, 2016, the album features vocals from Phyno, YCEE, Wale, Patoranking, Adekunle Gold, Olamide, Davido, Viktoh and Chinko Ekun with music production from in-house producers Young Jonn and Pheelz.

Critical reception
Upon its release, the album was met with mixed reviews by music enthusiasts and critics. Osareme Edeoghon, a writer for Music in Africa, described the album as "not quite satisfactory" and further went on to state that: "His rhyming is average; the album yields only a few memorable lines, [...] YAGI isn't a bad album. And were it not for the events that preceded its release, it might be said to be satisfactory". Joey Akan, a respected columnist of Pulse Nigeria gave the album 3 out of 5 stars, stating that: "Lil Kesh's first effort is a win for him, and for the street life. [...] "Y.A.G.I" stands tall as one of the most relatable works from rappers. Oluwatobi Ibironke of tooXclusive rated the album 3.2 out of 5 stating that: "The bottom line point is, YAGI could have been a great album with lucid critic silencing qualities, but no. It turned out an average album with a lot of flavour for club acceptance".,

Track listing

Release history

References

2016 albums
Albums produced by Pheelz
Albums produced by Young John (producer)
YBNL Nation albums
Lil Kesh albums